Sander Svendsen (born 6 August 1997) is a Norwegian professional footballer who plays as a forward or a winger for Eliteserien club Viking.

Early life
Sander Svendsen was born in Molde, and started to play football at a young age at the local club Molde FK. Both his parents, mother Ellen and father Svend Jarle, had represented the club at senior level. At age 14, Svendsen began to train regularly with Molde's senior team.

Club career

Molde FK
Svendsen made his first team debut on 9 May 2013, aged only 15, against Aalesund in a 4–1 win. He was brought on shortly before the final whistle by manager Ole Gunnar Solskjær. He scored his first competitive goal for the side on 21 April 2014, in a 5–1 win against Sarpsborg. Aged 16 years and 259 days, he is the fifth-youngest goalscorer in Eliteserien history. Amid his breakthrough at Molde, Svendsen trialed with the Dutch giants Ajax on several occasions. At the end of 2013, however, Svendsen signed a new three-year contract with Molde.

In 2014, Svendsen became the youngest player ever to win the Norwegian top flight, Eliteserien. Molde secured the championship title following a 2–1 victory against Viking on 4 October. Svendsen made 12 league appearances throughout the campaign. The same year, The Guardian rated him as one of the most promising football players in Europe born in 1997. The Danish newspaper BT also named Svendsen as one of the 20 best Scandinavian players under the age of 20.

Sander Svendsen made his continental debut during the 2014–15 UEFA Europa League, on 24 July 2014, in a 1–1 draw against the Slovenian club Gorica in the second qualifying round. He scored his first goal in the tournament in the third qualifying round about a week later, against Zorya Luhansk from Ukraine on away turf. The game finished 1–1 as Svendsen scored a late equalizer in the 88th minute.

In 2015, Svendsen played 26 league games for Molde. He scored a brace in a local derby against Aalesund on 20 April, in a 5–1 win. He scored another two goals on 16 May, in a 3–3 draw against Stabæk. At the end of the season, Svendsen was prized as the domestic "Talent of the Year" by the Norwegian Football Association. Roughly at the same time, Svendsen also renewed his contract with Molde, with his new deal lasting until the end of 2017.

During the upcoming season, Svendsen made 25 league appearances for Molde and scored 4 goals. He was used as a utility player, appearing as a striker, winger and central midfielder throughout the 2016 season. In April 2017, Tuttosport named Svendsen as one of the 98 best young players in Europe under the age of 21. The Italian newspaper nominated Svendsen for the Golden Boy award.

Hammarby IF
On 11 August 2017, Sander Svendsen transferred to Hammarby IF in Allsvenskan. The transfer fee was reportedly set at around 4 million Swedish kronor (approximately £0,4 million), as Svendsen only had six months left on his previous contract with Molde. Svendsen signed a four-year deal with the Stockholm-based side. He made his debut for the club only a few days later in a 2–2 home draw against Östersund, coming on as a second half sub. Svendsen scored his first competitive goal for the club on 16 August, in a 3–1 win against Akropolis IF in round 2 of the 2017–18 Svenska Cupen. On 21 August, he scored his first goal in Allsvenskan, in a 3–0 away win against Örebro SK. Svendsen scored his first brace for Hammarby in a 3–3 home draw against IK Sirius on 23 October. He scored another two goals, and also provided one assist, as Hammarby won 4–1 away against GIF Sundsvall on 29 October.

Odd (loan)
On 26 March 2019, Odds BK announced the signing of Svendsen on a loan deal until the summer.

OB
On 8 July 2019, Danish Superliga club Odense Boldklub announced that they had signed Svendsen on a four-year contract.

Brann (loan)
On the last day of the transfer window 2020, SK Brann announced that they had signed Svendsen on a six-month loan deal.

Odd (loan)
On 19 April 2021, Odd announced the signing of Svendsen on a loan deal. On 16 August 2021, Odd confirmed that Svendsen had returned to OB. However, on 31 August 2021, it was confirmed that the loan-spell at Odd had been extended until the end of 2021.

Viking
On 29 August 2022, Viking FK announced the signing of Svendsen on a three-and-a-half-year contract.

International career
From 2012 and onwards, Svendsen has won caps for several of the Norwegian youth national teams. For example, he established himself as a prolific member of the U17's in 2014, scoring 4 goals in 7 matches throughout the year.

Svendsen made his debut for the Norwegian U21s on 13 June 2015, aged 17, in a 2–0 win against Bosnia and Herzegovina in the 2017 UEFA European Under-21 Championship qualification.

Style of play
Sander Svendsen has been prized for his great ball control and vision, with fine technique and dribbling skills. His former  teammate at Molde, Mattias Moström, has compared Svendsen's style of play to that of Lionel Messi. ”He can shoot with both feet ... He is excellent in small spaces, gets past his opponent and then a swift finish”, Moström said.

Personal life
He is the older brother of fellow footballer Tobias Svendsen, a midfielder born in 1999. The duo played together at Molde between 2015 and 2017.

Career statistics

Club

Honours
Molde
 Eliteserien: 2014
 Norwegian Football Cup: 2013, 2014

Individual
Talent of the Year in Norway: 2015

References

1997 births
Living people
People from Molde
Norwegian footballers
Association football forwards
Norway youth international footballers
Norway under-21 international footballers
Molde FK players
Hammarby Fotboll players
Odds BK players
Odense Boldklub players
SK Brann players
Viking FK players
Eliteserien players
Allsvenskan players
Danish Superliga players
Norwegian expatriate footballers
Norwegian expatriate sportspeople in Sweden
Norwegian expatriate sportspeople in Denmark
Expatriate footballers in Sweden
Expatriate men's footballers in Denmark
Sportspeople from Møre og Romsdal